Women & Songs 4 is the fourth album in the Women & Songs franchise.

Overview 
The album was released on November 28, 2000.  As usual, the album is made up entirely of tracks from the best female artists in the industry.  19 tracks are featured on this compilation including Breathless (The Corrs), Breathe (Faith Hill), and Madonna's remake of Don McLean's American Pie.

The album peaked at #5 on the Top Canadian Album charts - a strong performance, but declining slowly as each new album comes out (the second edition reached #2, the third #4).

Track listing 
 American Pie (Don McLean) [4:33]
(performed by Madonna)
 Breathe (Stephanie Bentley/Holly Lamar) [4:09]
(performed by Faith Hill)
 Breathless (The Corrs/Robert John "Mutt" Lange) [3:27]
(performed by The Corrs)
 Before You (Jay Joyce/Chantal Kreviazuk) [3:53]
(performed by Chantal Kreviazuk)
 Sleepless (Russell Broom/Jann Arden Richards) [4:25]
(performed by Jann Arden)
 Together Again (Rene Elizondo/James Harris/Janet Jackson/Terry Lewis) [4:08]
(performed by Janet Jackson)
 Summerfling (k.d. lang/David Piltch) [3:52]
(performed by k.d. lang)
 Torn (Scott Cutler/Anne Preven/Phil Thornalley) [4:05]
(performed by Natalie Imbruglia)
 Telling Stories (Tracy Chapman) [3:59]
(performed by Tracy Chapman)
 When the Heartache Is Over (John Reid/Graham Stack) [3:44]
(performed by Tina Turner)
 Pure Shores (Shaznay Lewis/William Orbit) [4:27]
(performed by All Saints)
 You're Making Me High (Babyface/Bryce Wilson) [4:27]
(performed by Toni Braxton)
 Here With Me (Dido Armstrong/P. Angel Gabriel/Paul Statham) [4:14]
(performed by Dido)
 Tonight and the Rest of My Life (Nina Gordon) [4:23]
(performed by Nina Gordon)
 How Do I Live (Diane Warren) [4:06]
(performed by LeAnn Rimes)
 If I Fall (Tara MacLean) [4:09]
(performed by Tara MacLean)
 My Love Is Your Love (Jerry Duplessis/Wyclef Jean) [4:20]
(performed by Whitney Houston)
 High (Sarah Slean) [3:33]
(performed by Sarah Slean)
 A Whiter Shade of Pale (Gary Brooker/Keith Reed) [3:40]
(performed by Sarah Brightman)

References 
 [ Women & Songs 4 at AllMusic]

2000 compilation albums